Monomorium fieldi is an ant of the family Formicidae, endemic to the North Island and the north of the South Island of New Zealand.  It is found in a wide variety of habitats, but is very uncommon in forests.

References
 Antweb
 LandCare 
 Photo

Myrmicinae
Ants of New Zealand
Insects described in 1910